Wilson Sonsini Goodrich & Rosati is an American international law firm that specializes in business, securities, and intellectual property law. Headquartered in Palo Alto, California, the firm provides legal services to technology, life sciences, and growth enterprises worldwide, as well as the venture capital firms, private equity firms, and investment banks that finance them. The firm's clients operate in a range of technology industries, including the biotech, communications, digital media, energy, financial services, medical devices, mobile, semiconductor, and software sectors.

Core areas of experience include antitrust, corporate, intellectual property, litigation, technology transactions, and regulatory.

Locations
The firm's headquarters are on Page Mill Road in Palo Alto, California, as a part of the Stanford Research Park.

In total, Wilson Sonsini has offices in 12 locations in the U.S., including Austin, Texas; Boston, Massachusetts; Los Angeles, California; New York City; Palo Alto, California; San Diego, California; San Francisco, California; Seattle, Washington; Boulder, Colorado; Washington, D.C.; Wilmington, Delaware; and Salt Lake City,  Utah. Outside of the United States, it has offices in Hong Kong; Beijing and Shanghai, China; Brussels, Belgium; and London, England.

History
Wilson Sonsini was founded in 1961 as McCloskey, Wilson, Mosher & Martin in Palo Alto, California, with attorney Pete McCloskey and attorney John Arnot Wilson being two of the first named partners. Wilson was a graduate of Princeton University and Yale Law School's class of 1941, which included Supreme Court jurists Byron White and Potter Stewart as well as former President Gerald Ford. Since its launch, the firm concentrated on the representation of emerging technology companies and venture capitalists. In 1969, the firm helped form Mayfield Fund, one of the first major venture capital firms. In 1970, John B. Goodrich joined the firm. Larry Sonsini and Mario Rosati joined in 1966 and 1971, respectively. In 1978, the firm takes on the name it has had since: Wilson Sonsini Goodrich & Rosati, PC. The firm recently started to use the shortened name, "Wilson Sonsini" in conjunction with launching a new firm website, on November 6, 2019.

In 1980, Wilson Sonsini represented Apple Inc. in its much-publicized IPO. The firm was also involved in representing companies in the semiconductor industry, like LSI Logic, Altera, Cirrus Logic, Lattice Semiconductor, and Cypress Semiconductor. These companies were among those that helped Silicon Valley earn its name.

For many years, Wilson Sonsini had only one office, in Palo Alto. In late 1998, the firm opened its first national office, in Kirkland, Washington, led by partner Patrick Schultheis. Within the next few years, the firm opened offices in Austin, Texas; San Francisco; Northern Virginia; New York; and San Diego. In 2005, Wilson Sonsini launched an office in China and boosted its New York office. In 2006 the firm relocated its Northern Virginia lawyers to Washington, D.C., to be closer to government regulators and the firm eventually moved its Kirkland office to Seattle. The firm has also since opened offices in Los Angeles; Boston; Wilmington, Delaware; Salt Lake City, Utah; and Boulder, Colorado. Internationally, the firm now has offices in London; Brussels; Beijing; Hong Kong; and Shanghai.

Like other law firms representing start-up technology companies, Wilson Sonsini accepted equity in its clients as a form of payment in return for deferral of fees, and also passed on stakes in its investment fund to associates and staff members as a means of retaining employees.

In 1994, Wilson Sonsini represented Netscape Communications in its IPO, in addition to representing several other companies that, like Netscape, were tied to the start of the Internet Age, including Infoseek, USWeb/CKS, and Inktomi. Wilson Sonsini also began to lead the nation in the number of issuer IPO transactions, completing 37 IPOs in 1995 and 44 IPOs in 1997.

In 1999, when VA Linux went public, the firm reaped $24.5 million as the value of the 100,000 shares that the firm held ballooned in value. Other IPOs that enriched the firm because of its equity stake were those of Ask Jeeves, Google, and online grocer Webvan. With the downturn in the dotcom economy, however, Wilson Sonsini had to make a number of adjustments; 100 support staff and 60 associates were laid off—about 10% of its attorneys. Better times eventually returned. In 2004, the firm advised Google on its $2.7 billion IPO. 

In 2016, Wilson Sonsini represented long-time client LinkedIn in their $26.2 billion acquisition by Microsoft, which represented Microsoft's largest ever acquisition.

In a 2021 assessment, Wilson Sonsini was singled out as having among the best records in climate change mitigation efforts.

Wilson Sonsini is currently representing Twitter in the transaction involving Elon Musk's $44 billion take-private bid. 

In 2022, Wilson Sonsini represented Pacific Light & Hologram, Inc. in retrieving parts of a device that would have otherwise been used to capture imagery during the Lunar Occultation of Mars.

Notable people
In addition to numerous professors and partners, both at Wilson Sonsini and other firms, some of the more notable current and former Wilson Sonsini attorneys include:

 Michael Arrington, founder, TechCrunch
 William B. Chandler, III, judge, Delaware Superior Court; Chancellor, Delaware Court of Chancery (1989–2007)
 Peter Detkin, Managing Partner at Intellectual Ventures
 David Drummond, Chief Legal Officer and Senior Vice President at Google
 Mark Farrell, supervisor, San Francisco Board of Supervisors (2011– )
 Richard Frenkel, former Director of Intellectual Property at Cisco
 Chris Kelly, first General Counsel of Facebook, Democratic candidate for Attorney General of California
 Ro Khanna, Congressman, United States House of Representatives (2017– ); former Deputy Assistant Secretary, United States Department of Commerce
 Lucy H. Koh, judge, United States Court of Appeals for the Ninth Circuit (2021-); former judge, United States District Court for the Northern District of California (2010–2021)
 Pete McCloskey, Congressman, United States House of Representatives (1967–83)
 John Roos, former CEO of Wilson Sonsini; United States Ambassador to Japan (2009–13)
 Larry Sonsini, senior partner and founder, "godfather" of Silicon Valley Law
 Joshua D. Wright, Commissioner, Federal Trade Commission (2013–2015)
 Chiang Wan-an, Legislator of the Legislative Yuan in the ROC (Taiwan), elect-Mayor of Taipei (2023-)

See also
 List of largest United States-based law firms by profits per partner

References

External links
 

Law firms based in Palo Alto, California
1961 establishments in California
Law firms established in 1961
Intellectual property law firms